Armando "Bing" Lao is a multi-awarded Filipino film writer and director best known for writing the screenplay for 
such films as Brillante Mendoza's Kinatay, Jeffrey Jeturian's Kubrador and Pila Balde, and Chito S. Roño's Suntok sa Buwan.

Lao also founded the Philippines' influential "Found Story Screenwriting Workshop"

References 

Living people
Filipino film directors
Year of birth missing (living people)